Tayside was one of the nine regions used for local government in Scotland from 15 May 1975 to 31 March 1996. The region was named for the River Tay.

History

The region was created by the Local Government (Scotland) Act 1973, following recommendations made by the 1969 Wheatley Report which attempted to replace the mishmash of counties, cities, burghs and districts, with a uniform two-tier system of regional and district councils. Since the Local Government etc. (Scotland) Act 1994, the former Tayside has been divided into the council areas of Angus, the City of Dundee and Perth and Kinross, which had previously been the region's districts.

Tayside Regional Council directly operated local bus services in the City of Dundee from 1975 until 1986, when bus deregulation under terms of the Transport Act 1985 was implemented. The restructured Tayside Buses became employee-owned in 1991, was sold to National Express in 1997, and today trades as Xplore Dundee. The regional headquarters was at Tayside House.

Continued use
Tayside continues to have a joint electoral, valuation, and health board. It retained its police and fire services until they were merged, on 1 April 2013, into bodies known as Police Scotland and the Scottish Fire and Rescue Service, which cover the whole of Scotland. Provision of healthcare across the region also continues via NHS Tayside.

Angus Council, Dundee City Council and Perth and Kinross Council formed Tayside Contracts as their commercial arm and to provide shared services, such as road and housing maintenance, winter maintenance (snow clearing and gritting), catering and cleaning services across the former Tayside area. Tayside Contracts services are open to the public and all profits from the company are equally fed back into each of the three councils to bolster revenue to the local authorities to provide cash for services as a boost to central government and council tax income.

Electoral history

References

External links

 

 
Regions of Scotland
1975 establishments in Scotland
1996 disestablishments in Scotland